Gare de Bennwihr is a former railway station in Bennwihr in the department of Haut-Rhin, region Grand Est in eastern France. It was on the rail line from Strasbourg to Colmar.

Defunct railway stations in Grand Est